Chevak (Cevʼaq , which means "cut-through channel" in Chevak Cup’ik) is a city in Kusilvak Census Area, Alaska, United States. At the 2010 census the population was 938, up from 765 in 2000.

There is a tri-language system in Chevak; English, Cup’ik, and a mixture of the two languages. The people in Chevak speak a dialect of Central Yup'ik, Cup'ik (pr. Chew-pick), and identify themselves as Cup'ik people rather than Yup'ik. This unique identity has allowed them to form a single-site school district, the Kashunamiut School District, rather than joining a neighboring Yup'ik school district. The Cup'ik dialect is distinguished from Yup'ik by the change of "y" sounds into "ch" sounds, represented by the letter "c", and by some words that are completely different from Yup'ik words.

Geography
Chevak is located at  (61.527673, -165.578702) in the Yukon-Kuskokwim Delta region of southwest Alaska, approximately 6 miles from the Bering Sea coastline, 18 miles east of Hooper Bay and 26 miles south of Scammon Bay. Transportation into, and out of, Chevak is by air or water, or regional ice roads in the winter. As with many communities in Alaska, Chevak is not connected to the national road network.

Infrastructure and utilities

Chevak is powered by four 30-meter-tall wind turbines. The wind generated in Chevak is classified as "Class 6 – Outstanding", and is owned and operated by AVEC (Alaska Villages Electric Cooperative).

In addition, electrical power is supplied by four diesel generators capable of supplying up to a combined 1828 kilowatts of electricity year-round, with the tank farm storing up to 302,000 gallons of diesel fuel. This, in addition to the 400 kilowatts generated by the wind turbines, gives Chevak’s electrical grid a total capacity of 2228 kilowatts.

As of 2022, all buildings in Chevak have running water and piped sewage, supported by a central water treatment facility built in 1984, and a central wastewater treatment plant built in 2001. An outage, due to the old school fire in 2021, affected service to the eastern half of Chevak, with many residents forced to resort back to honey buckets as toilets.

Internet access is provided by GCI via their TERRA microwave network. There is 3G cellular coverage as well as broadband available for residents and businesses.

Demographics

As of the census of 2000, there were 765 people, 167 households, and 129 families residing in the city. The racial makeup of the city was 3.66% White, 90.46% Native American, 0.13% from other races, and 5.75% from two or more races.  0.65% of the population were Hispanic or Latino of any race.

There were 167 households, out of which 64.1% had children under the age of 18 living with them. 41.3% were married couples living together, 20.4% had a female householder with no husband present, and 22.2% were non-families. 19.2% of all households were made up of individuals, and 0.6% had someone living alone who was 65 years of age or older.  The average household size was 4.58 and the average family size was 5.38.

In the city, the age distribution of the population shows 51.8% under the age of 18, 8.8% from 18 to 24, 23.9% from 25 to 44, 11.5% from 45 to 64, and 4.1% who were 65 years of age or older.  The median age was 17 years. For every 100 females, there were 113.7 males.  For every 100 females age 18 and over, there were 113.3 males.

The median income for a household in the city was $26,875, and the median income for a family was $27,375. Males had a median income of $21,875 versus $18,125 for females. The per capita income for the city was $7,550.  About 26.7% of families and 29.5% of the population were below the poverty line, including 32.5% of those under age 18 and 13.3% of those age 65 or over.

Old Chevak (1940)

Chevak first appeared on the 1940 U.S. Census as an unincorporated native village. At the time it was located above the junction of the Keoklevik & Kashunuk Rivers at an altitude of 7 feet.  In the 1940s, residents relocated 9 miles northwest to a new village due to flooding from high storm tides. The old site became Old Chevak and was abandoned and did not report again on the census.

New Chevak (1950)
The new Chevak appeared on the 1950 U.S. Census as an unincorporated village, relocated from its original site 9 miles away on higher ground. It formally incorporated as a city in 1967.

As of 2022, Chevak has a post office, community hall, radio station, three stores, a church, a clinic, a public safety building, and two restaurants. There are no public lodges or hotels in Chevak, although visitors invited by the Traditional Council are often provided housing.

The current Chevak school was built in 2005, and currently serves approximately 360 students via approximately 60 staff. In 2021, the old school, shut down for renovations and removal of toxins such as asbestos, was destroyed in a fire. The old school was planned to be turned into a community center, before its destruction. Two individuals went missing at the time of the fire, which resulted in the Alaska State Troopers launching an investigation. The cause of the fire is still unknown. The Alaska Department of Environmental Conservation is providing 2.5 million dollars in funds towards the cleanup effort and removal of debris from the destroyed school.

Photo gallery

References

Cities in Alaska
Cities in Kusilvak Census Area, Alaska
1967 establishments in Alaska